

Businesses and organizations 
 Air Tahiti Nui (IATA airline designation "TN" since 1998), a French Polynesian airline
 Texas and Northern Railway, an American railway (reporting mark "TN")
 Todo Noticias, an Argentine cable news network
 Trans Australia Airlines (IATA airline designation "TN" until 1994), a defunct Australian airline
 Transports en commun de Neuchâtel et environs, a public transport operator in Neuchâtel, Switzerland

Places 
 Tamil Nadu, a state in southern India (ISO abbreviation "IN-TN")
 Tennessee, US (postal abbreviation "TN")
 Tonbridge, a region in England (postcode "TN")
 Tunisia (ISO 3166-1 country code "TN")
 Trentino, a province in Italy (ISO abbreviation "IT-TN")

Other
 North Tipperary, Ireland (former code "TN")

Science and technology 
 .tn, the country code top level domain (ccTLD) for Tunisia
 TN network, a type of earthing system for protection in electricity network
 Neel Temperature, the temperature at which an antiferromagnetic material becomes paramagnetic (represented as TN)
 Tetraodon, a genus of pufferfish
 Trigeminal neuralgia, a neuropathic disorder
 Transposon (when immediately followed by a number), a DNA sequence that can change positions
 Twisted nematic field effect, the technology that made LCD displays practical
 Thoron, symbol Tn, a sometimes used name for the nuclide radon-220

Other uses 
 TN status ("Treaty national", or "Trade NAFTA"), an immigration status of a Canadian or Mexican citizen working in the USA under the NAFTA agreement
 Telephone number, in the telecommunications industry
 Tom Next (or Tomorrow Next), a financial trade which starts tomorrow and settles in the next trading day
 Trillion ("TN" or "tn"), a number equal to 1012 (short scale) or 1018 (long scale)
 Tswana language (ISO 639-1 language code)
 Translators Note ("TN" or "t/n")
 Turbonave, an Italian ship prefix, indicating that the ship was propelled by a turbine engine.